Rosaleen Davey (born 1947) is an Irish visual artist.

Biography
Rosaleen Davey was born in Belfast in 1947. She has lived in Dublin since the 1970s. Davey studied in the Ulster College of Art in Belfast and at Leeds University. Davey studied with Colin Harrison. She has taught painting at the National College of Art and Design. Davey creates figurative or abstract. Her works have been exhibited in a number of galleries in Ireland such as the Ayesha Castle Gallery, Co. Dublin in 1997, Butler Gallery, Kilkenny in 1996 and the Caldwell Gallery, Dublin in 1982. She has also exhibited at the Cavanacor Gallery, Taylor Galleries, Fenderesky Gallery, the RHA, the Irish Museum of Modern Art and Crawford Art Gallery. Davey's work is included in Irish public collections.

Sources

1947 births
Living people
Artists from Belfast
20th-century Irish painters
21st-century Irish painters